Daniel Archer (born 26 October 1991) is an Australian rules football player who played for St Kilda Football Club in the Australian Football League (AFL) and North Adelaide Football Club in the South Australian National Football League (SANFL).

Originally from Tasmanian Football League (TFL) club Clarence, Archer was recruited by St Kilda with pick number 36 at the 2010 AFL Rookie Draft and made his senior AFL debut in round 2, 2011, against . Dropped after a quiet match, Archer did not return to the senior team and played the remainder of 2011 and all of 2012 with St Kilda's Victorian Football League (VFL) affiliated side Sandringham.

Archer was delisted by St Kilda at the end of 2012 and recruited by SANFL club North Adelaide. Injuries delayed his debut for North Adelaide until Round 19 of the 2013 SANFL season. He left North Adelaide after a single injury-riddled season in which he managed only three senior games to move to Wangaratta Rovers in the Ovens & Murray Football League for the 2014 season.

Archer played a one off game for Tasmanian Football League (TSL) club Kingborough in 2017.

References

External links
 
 Daniel Archer's player profile on the St Kilda Football Club's website

1991 births
Living people
St Kilda Football Club players
Australian rules footballers from Tasmania
Clarence Football Club players
North Adelaide Football Club players
Sandringham Football Club players
Wangaratta Rovers Football Club players
Kingborough Football Club players